LateLine is an American sitcom television series that premiered on NBC on March 17, 1998. The series concluded on March 16, 1999, with seven episodes left unaired due to an abrupt cancellation. Three of the unaired episodes were telecast by the Showtime cable network in December 1999.

Created by John Markus and Al Franken (the latter of whom co-starred in the series), LateLine depicted the behind-the-scenes goings-on of a fictitious late-night television news broadcast, patterned in part after the long-running ABC program Nightline. Many plotlines in the series were satirical, dealing with topics like Deep Throat and the Watergate break-in, and the episodes often had cameos by famous politicians.

Cast
Al Franken.....Al Freundlich: Chief Correspondent
Megyn Price.....Gale Ingersoll: Producer
Miguel Ferrer......Vic Kobb: Executive Producer
Ajay Naidu.....Raji Bakshi: Intern
Sanaa Lathan.....Briana Gilliam: Talent Booker
Catherine Lloyd Burns.....Mona: Pearce's Assistant
Robert Foxworth......Pearce McKenzie: Anchor

Episode list

Season 1: 1998

Season 2: 1999

* Not aired on NBC

Home media
On August 17, 2004, Paramount released a DVD set containing all nineteen episodes on three discs.

External links

 
Al Franken Fan Club and Discussion Forum

Television series by CBS Studios
NBC original programming
1990s American sitcoms
1998 American television series debuts
1999 American television series endings
Television shows set in Washington, D.C.
Television news sitcoms
Al Franken